Noukadubi (Bengali: নৌকাডুবি, English: Boat wreck) is a Bengali drama film directed by Naresh Chandra Mitra based on a 1906 novel of the same name of Rabindranath Tagore. This film was released on 19 September 1947 under the banner of Bombay Talkies. This is a remake of 1946 Hindi film Milan made by the director Nitin Bose where Dilip Kumar starring in the lead role. It was among the big Bengali grossers of 1947.

Plot
The story revolves around Ramesh's life. He is a young law student who is forced into an arranged marriage though he is in love with somebody else. Following the wedding the drama focuses on the bride's mistaken identity and the search for her husband.

Cast
 Pahari Sanyal as Father of Hemnalini
 Abhi Bhattacharya as Ramesh
 Meera Mishra as Kamala
 Biman Bandyopadhyay as Akhay
 Shyam Laha as Kamala's husband
 Mani Chatterjee
 Priti Majumdar
 Sunalini Devi
 Gayatri Debi
 Upen Chattopadhyay
 Iti Chakraborty

See also
 Noukadubi (novel)
 Milan (1946 film)
 Ghunghat (1960 film)
 Noukadubi (2011 film)

References

External links
 

1947 films
Bengali-language Indian films
Films based on works by Rabindranath Tagore
Films set in the 1920s
Films set in the British Raj
1947 drama films
Films based on Indian novels
Films scored by Anil Biswas
Bengali films remade in other languages
Indian drama films
Indian black-and-white films
1940s Bengali-language films